C. madagascariensis  may refer to:
 Calicalicus madagascariensis, the Red-tailed Vanga, a bird species endemic to Madagascar
 Caprimulgus madagascariensis, the Madagascar Nightjar, a bird species found in Comoros, Madagascar, Mayotte and Seychelles
 Capurodendron madagascariensis, a plant species in the genus Capurodendron and the family Sapotaceae
 Cassis madagascariensis, a sea snail species found in the tropical Western Atlantic
 Cathariostachys madagascariensis, a bamboo species found in Madagascar
 Ceyx madagascariensis, the Madagascar Pygmy-kingfisher, a bird species endemic to Madagascar
 Chalarodon madagascariensis, a lizard species found in Madagascar
 Chrysotus madagascariensis, a fly species in the genus Chrysotus
 Coluzea madagascariensis, a sea snail species
 Coniogramme madagascariensis, a fern species
 Conus madagascariensis, a sea snail species
 Cordyla madagascariensis, a plant species found only in Madagascar
 Crematogaster madagascariensis, an ant species in the genus Crematogaster
 Ctenolimnophila madagascariensis, a crane fly species in the genus Ctenolimnophila

Synonyms
 Carissa madagascariensis, a synonym for Carissa spinarum, the conkerberry or bush plum, a shrub species distributed in tropical regions around the Indian Ocean
 Chrysiridia madagascariensis, a synonym for Chrysiridia rhipheus, the Madagascan sunset moth, a day-flying moth species endemic to Madagascar

See also